In Greek mythology, Arne, also called Melanippe or Antiopa, was the daughter of Aeolus and Melanippe (also Hippe or Euippe), daughter of Chiron.

Mythology 
Arne was born as a foal as her mother had been transformed into a horse as a disguise, but was returned to the human form and renamed Arne. According to John Tzetzes, Arne was the nurse of the young Poseidon, who denied knowing where he was when Cronus came searching for him. Aeolus entrusted her to the care of one Desmontes.  However, Poseidon fathered Aeolus and Boeotus with her while he was in the form of a bull. Enraged, Desmontes entombed and blinded her and placed her twin sons on Mount Pelion. She was later rescued by her sons and married king Metapontus of Icaria, and Poseidon restored her vision.

Through Boeotus, she was the ancestress of the Boeotians. A city named after her was recorded in the Iliad'''s Catalogue of Ships which has been tentatively identified with the ruins of Gla.

See also
 Arne Sithonis, the princess also known as "Arne of Siphnos"

Notes

 References 

 Diodorus Siculus, The Library of History translated by Charles Henry Oldfather. Twelve volumes. Loeb Classical Library. Cambridge, Massachusetts: Harvard University Press; London: William Heinemann, Ltd. 1989. Vol. 3. Books 4.59–8. Online version at Bill Thayer's Web Site
 Diodorus Siculus, Bibliotheca Historica. Vol 1-2. Immanel Bekker. Ludwig Dindorf. Friedrich Vogel. in aedibus B. G. Teubneri. Leipzig. 1888–1890. Greek text available at the Perseus Digital Library.
Gaius Julius Hyginus, Fabulae from The Myths of Hyginus translated and edited by Mary Grant. University of Kansas Publications in Humanistic Studies. Online version at the Topos Text Project.
Graves, Robert, The Greek Myths'', Harmondsworth, London, England, Penguin Books, 1960. 

Princesses in Greek mythology
Metamorphoses into humanoids in Greek mythology
Boeotian characters in Greek mythology
Boeotian mythology